Year 1483 (MCDLXXXIII) was a common year starting on Wednesday (link will display the full calendar) of the Julian calendar.

Events 
 January–December 
 January 1 – The Jews are expelled from Andalusia.
 February 11 – The General Council of the Inquisition is created in Spain.
 April 9 – Edward V becomes King of England.
 April 29 – Gran Canaria, the main island of the Canary Islands, is conquered by the Kingdom of Castile, a very important step in the expansion of Spain.
 April 30 – Pluto moves inside Neptune's orbit until July 23, 1503, according to modern orbital calculations.
 April – King Edward V of England and his younger brother Richard, Duke of York reside in the Tower of London. Later this year, rumors of their murders start circulating. By December the rumors have reached France. This is the beginning of the mystery concerning the fates of the two Princes in the Tower.
 June 13 – William Hastings, 1st Baron Hastings, is executed, in the first recorded execution at the Tower of London.
 June 20 – The powerful Fernando II, Duke of Braganza is executed in Portugal, followed by more than 80 other noblemen, for his plot against the royal crown.
 June 25 – Before his coronation, King Edward V of England is deposed by his uncle, Richard, Duke of Gloucester, who becomes King as Richard III of England.
 July 6 – Richard III and Anne Neville are crowned king and Queen of England, at Westminster Abbey.
 July 20 – John of Denmark is crowned King of Norway.
 August 15 – The Sistine Chapel opens in the Apostolic Palace in Rome.
 September 3 – The Princes in the Tower, uncrowned 12-year-old Edward V of England and his 10-year-old brother, Richard, Duke of York, are perhaps murdered this night in the Tower of London.
 October – A rebellion by the Duke of Buckingham is crushed by Richard III of England.
 October 29 – Battle of Una: Forces of the Kingdom of Croatia defeat the army of the Ottoman Empire.

 Date unknown 
 Isaac Abravanel flees Portugal, after being implicated in a plot against the king.
 The Prince of Moscow builds the fortress of Ivangorod, facing Narva.
 Giovanni Bellini is named official painter of the Republic of Venice.
 Flavio Biondo publishes his Historiarum ab inclinatione romanorum imperii.

Births 

 January 12 – Henry III of Nassau-Breda, Baron of Breda (d. 1538)
 February 14 – Zahir al-Din Mohammed Babur Shah, founder of the Moghul Dynasty (d. 1530)
 March 6 – Francesco Guicciardini, Italian historian and statesman (d. 1540)
 April 6 – Raphael, Italian painter and architect (d. 1520)
 April 19 – Paolo Giovio, Italian bishop (d. 1552)
 July 20 – Wang Gen, Chinese philosopher (d. 1541)
 September 3 – Eric II, Duke of Mecklenburg (d. 1508)
 October 16 – Gasparo Contarini, Italian diplomat and cardinal (d. 1542)
 October 26 – Hans Buchner, German Renaissance composer (d. 1538)
 November 10 – Martin Luther, German monk and Protestant reformer (d. 1546)
 November 16 – Elisabeth of the Palatinate, Landgravine of Hesse, German noble (d. 1522)
 December 3 – Nicolaus von Amsdorf, German theologian and Protestant reformer (d. 1565)
 date unknown
 Thomas Parr, Englishman, alleged oldest living man (d. 1635)
 Cacamatzin, Aztec ruler (d. 1520)
 Jacquet of Mantua, French composer (d. 1559)
 Chen Chun, Chinese painter (d. 1544)
 Felice della Rovere, also known as Madonna Felice, the illegitimate daughter of Pope Julius II (d. 1536)

Deaths 
 January 19 – William IV, Lord of Egmont, IJsselstein, Schoonderwoerd and Haastrecht and Stadtholder of Guelders (b. 1412)
 February 27 – William VIII, Marquess of Montferrat (b. 1420)
 March 23 – Yolande, Duchess of Lorraine (b. 1428)
 April 4 – Henry Bourchier, 1st Earl of Essex (b. c. 1405)
 April 9 – King Edward IV of England (b. 1442)
 April 24 – Margaret of Bourbon, French noble (b. 1438)
 May 4 – George Neville, Duke of Bedford (b. 1457)
 May 6 – Queen Jeonghui, Korean regent (b. 1418) 
 June 13 – William Hastings, 1st Baron Hastings (executed; b. 1431)
 June 25
Anthony Woodville, 2nd Earl Rivers (executed; b. 1442)
 Richard Grey, half brother of Edward V of England (executed; b. 1458)
 July 4 – Costanzo I Sforza, Italian condottiero (b. 1447)
 August 30 – King Louis XI of France (b. 1423)
 November 2 – Henry Stafford, 2nd Duke of Buckingham, English politician (b. 1454)
 December 1 – Charlotte of Savoy, French queen (b. 1441)
 date unknown
 Edmund Sutton, English nobleman (b. 1425)
 Elise Eskilsdotter, Norwegian noblewoman and pirate

References